The Ozone Mac Daddy Bi (or McDaddy) is a French two-place paraglider that was designed by hang gliding and paragliding world champion pilot Robbie Whittall and produced by Ozone Gliders of Le Bar-sur-Loup. It is no longer in production.

Design and development
The aircraft was designed as a tandem glider for flight training and as such was referred to as the Mac Daddy Bi, indicating "bi-place" or two seater. It replaced the Ozone Cosmic Rider in the production line.

The models are each named for their approximate wing area in square metres.

Operational history
Reviewer Noel Bertrand described the Ozone series of gliders in a 2003 review as, "wings that are both pleasant to fly and high performance in their respective categories".

Variants
Mac Daddy Bi 41
Small-sized model for lighter pilots. The glider model is DHV 1-2 certified.
Mac Daddy Bi 44
Large-sized model for heavier pilots. The glider model is DHV 1-2 certified.

Specifications (Mac Daddy Bi 44)

References

External links

Mac Daddy Bi
Paragliders